Michael F. Cavanagh (born October 21, 1940 in Lansing, Michigan) is former justice of the Michigan Supreme Court.

He is a younger brother of Jerome Cavanagh who was Mayor of Detroit in the 1960s.

He previously served as a judge on the Michigan Court of Appeals from 1975 to 1982. Before that, he served as Lansing City Attorney and as a District Court judge.

Cavanagh served as chief justice from 1991 to 1995.

In November 2018, his daughter, Megan Cavanagh, was elected as an associate justice of the Michigan Supreme Court, and became the first child to have joined her parent as a member of the Court since 1857.

References

Living people
Michigan state court judges
Michigan Court of Appeals judges
Chief Justices of the Michigan Supreme Court
1940 births
University of Detroit Jesuit High School and Academy alumni
Justices of the Michigan Supreme Court